KMMY (96.5 FM, "My Rock 96.5") is a radio station licensed to serve Soper, Oklahoma, United States. The station is owned by Will Payne.

KMMY broadcasts an active rock and sports talk format to the greater Paris, Texas, area.

Current program schedule:

 Bladerunner Radio  5a-8a M-F
 The Dan Patrick Show 8a-11a M-F
 The Rocklaholics Ride Home 3p-7p M-F
n Fox Sports Radio Programming Sundays 5a-12p

History
This station received its original construction permit from the Federal Communications Commission on March 9, 2005.  The new station was assigned the call letters EGPG by the FCC on April 12, 2006.  The station began broadcasting as "My Rock 96.5" on March 10, 2008.  KMMY received its license to cover from the FCC on March 25, 2008.

References

External links

MMY
Active rock radio stations in the United States
Radio stations established in 2008
Choctaw County, Oklahoma